Alexander von Nordmann (24 May 1803 in Ruotsinsalmi (now Kotka), Finland – 25 June 1866 in Helsinki) was a 19th-century Finnish biologist, who contributed to zoology, parasitology, botany and paleontology.

Biography
Nordmann was a son of an officer of the Russian army at the Ruotsinsalmi fortress, SE Finland. He started academic studies at the Imperial Academy of Turku, and at that time also acted as a curator of the entomological collections. In 1827 he continued studies in Berlin with the famous parasitologist and anatomist Karl Rudolphi. His first major work was a microscopical description of tens of parasitic worms and crustaceans from the eyes and other organs of fishes and other animals, including man. These included the enigmatic monogenean Diplozoon paradoxum.

In 1832 he was appointed a professor (teacher) at the Lyceum Richelieu in Odessa, Ukraine, and in 1834 also the director of the Odessa Botanical Garden and the associated Central Gardening School. He participated in several expeditions and collected natural history specimens in southern Russia and adjacent regions. Later, in 1849, he became professor of Zoology and Botany at the Imperial Alexander University in Finland (Helsinki). He died of heart failure on 25 June 1866.

Taxa
The cladoceran Evadne nordmanni, the Nordmann fir Abies nordmanniana and at least seven other species and one genus (Nordmannia) have been named after him. The standard author abbreviation Nordm. is used to indicate this individual as the author when citing a botanical name.

Major works
 Mikrographische Beiträge zur Naturgeschichte der wirbellosen Thiere I - II. Berlin 1832
 Voyage dans la Russie méridionale et la Crimée, par la Hongrie, la Valachie et la Moldawie, exécuté en 1837, sous la Direction de M. Anatole de Demidoff. III. Observations sur la Faune pontique. Paris 1840
 Histoire naturelle des animaux sans vertèbres. III. Entozoa. Paris 1840 
 Versuch einer Natur- und Entwickelungsgeschichte des Tergipes Edwardsii. - Mémoires présentés à l'Académie Impériale des Science de St. Petersbourg IV. St. Petersburg 1845
 Palaeontologie Südrusslands I - IV.'' 1858 - 1860

References

 ALEXANDER DAVIDOVICH VON NORDMANN  cybertruffle.org.uk

Finnish zoologists
Finnish paleontologists
Academic staff of the University of Helsinki
1803 births
1866 deaths
People from Kotka
Botanists with author abbreviations